|}

The Flying Five Stakes is a Group 1 flat horse race in Ireland open to thoroughbreds aged three years or older. It is run at the Curragh over a distance of 5 furlongs (1,006 metres), and it is scheduled to take place each year in September during Irish Champions Weekend.

History
The event was formerly held at Phoenix Park, and it used to be classed at Listed level. For a period it was open to horses aged two or older. It was promoted to Group 3 status in 1988, and transferred to Leopardstown in 1991.

The race was moved to the Curragh and upgraded to Group 2 level in 2002. The minimum age of participating horses was raised to three in 2003, and the event reverted to Group 3 status in 2004. It was previously run in late August or early September but from 2014 it was moved to mid-September and became part of the Irish Champions Weekend fixture, switching places in the calendar with the Renaissance Stakes.  It was reinstated as a Group 2 race in 2015 and upgraded to Group 1 status in 2018, when it became the first Group 1 sprint in Ireland open to horses aged three years and older.

The Flying Five Stakes was sponsored by bettor.com prior to 2013. It was previously sponsored by Moyglare Stud, and its full title included the name of Market Slide, a successful Moyglare broodmare. It was unsponsored in 2013, and Derrinstown Stud took over the sponsorship in 2014.

Records

Most successful horse since 1985 (3 wins):
 Benbaun – 2005, 2006, 2007

Leading jockey since 1985 (6 wins):
 Michael Kinane – Committed (1985), Flowing (1991), Tropical (1993, 1994), Ishiguru (2001), Ringmoor Down (2004)

Leading trainer since 1985 (5 wins):
 Dermot Weld – Committed (1985), Flowing (1991, 1992), Tropical (1993, 1994)

Winners since 1985

See also
 Horse racing in Ireland
 List of Irish flat horse races

References

 Racing Post:

 galopp-sieger.de – Flying Five Stakes.
 horseracingintfed.com – International Federation of Horseracing Authorities – Flying Five Stakes (2018).
 irishracinggreats.com – Flying Five (Group 3).
 pedigreequery.com – Flying Five Stakes.

Flat races in Ireland
Curragh Racecourse
Open sprint category horse races
Breeders' Cup Challenge series